Oswald was king of East Anglia, present-day United Kingdom in the 870s after the death of Edmund the Martyr. No textual evidence of his reign is known, but coins inscribed with his name are known.

Rule
Evidence suggests that during the period between the death of Edmund and the return of Guthrum to East Anglia in 880, Oswald and Æthelred ruled the East Angles as client kings. It is possible that the East Anglian aristocracy had been almost, but not entirely, extinguished by the Viking attacks that resulted in Edmund's death, and that in the years when Oswald, Æthelred and Guthrum successively ruled the kingdom, there was a period of opposition or defiance against the Danish leadership. The Vikings ruled the East Angles from the accession of Oswald until 920, when East Anglia was incorporated into the kingdom of England, following the defeat of the Danes by Edward the Elder.

Coinage

The existence of Oswald is known solely because of his coins. Coins and silver bullion were used throughout this period, when the Vikings continued the Anglo-Saxon tradition of producing silver pennies, although at a reduced rate. Eight coins are known from the reigns of Æthelred and Oswald, whereas over 200 coins are known to have been made by the moneyers of Oswald's predecessor, Edmund.

A few coins bearing Oswald's name were found in the Cuerdale Hoard. The coins can be dated from the 870s to the 900s, following the death of Edmund. One coin, produced by a moneyer whose name started Beor..., is of the temple type; another has an alpha, a common East Anglian design.

Popular culture
Oswald makes an appearance as a side character in the 2020 video game Assassin's Creed: Valhalla, which is set in the 870s.

References

Sources

Anglo-Saxon warriors
East Anglian monarchs
9th-century English monarchs